Leonel Galeano (born 2 August 1991) is an Argentine footballer who plays as a central defender for FBC Melgar in the Liga 1.

Club career
Born in Miramar, Buenos Aires Province, Galeano graduated from Independiente's youth setup, and played his first match as a professional on 21 August 2009, starting in a 0–1 home loss against Newell's Old Boys. He scored his first goal for the club on 18 October, netting his side's only in a 1–1 draw with Chacarita Juniors.

Galeano appeared in 34 matches during his debut campaign, overtaking veterans Carlos Matheu and Gabriel Vallés. He also featured regularly during the Copa Sudamericana's winning campaign, appearing in nine matches and scoring once.

Galeano fell through the pecking order in the following campaigns, after the arrivals of Gabriel Milito and Claudio Morel. He appeared in 23 matches in 2012–13, as the Diablos were relegated.

On 31 July 2013, Galeano signed a one-year deal with La Liga side Rayo Vallecano. However, after a campaign marred by injuries, he was released by the Madrid side.

International career
Galeano made his debut for the Argentina national team on 10 February 2010, in a 2–1 victory over Jamaica. The Argentina squad was formed exclusively by players of the Argentine league.

In 2011, Galeano was selected to play for the Argentina under-20 national football team the South American Youth Championship and, subsequently, the FIFA U-20 World Cup.

Honours
Independiente
Copa Sudamericana (1): 2010

References

External links
 
 
 

1991 births
Living people
Sportspeople from Buenos Aires Province
Argentine footballers
Argentina under-20 international footballers
Argentina international footballers
Argentine expatriate footballers
Argentine expatriate sportspeople in Spain
Association football defenders
Argentine Primera División players
La Liga players
Club Atlético Independiente footballers
Rayo Vallecano players
Godoy Cruz Antonio Tomba footballers
Aldosivi footballers
FBC Melgar footballers
Expatriate footballers in Spain